Neil Roden (born 9 April 1980) is a former rugby league footballer who usually played as a  or . He made his professional debut in 2000 with Lancashire Lynx, but spent the majority of his playing career with Oldham, making a total of nearly 300 appearances for the club. He also had spells with Leigh Centurions and Batley Bulldogs, and played at international level for Ireland, winning two caps in 2003.

Playing career

Club career
Born in Wigan, Roden started his career with hometown club Wigan Warriors. Unable to break into the first team, he was loaned out to Lancashire Lynx, where he made his senior debut against Whitehaven in January 2000. He was signed by Oldham a few months later, and made his first appearance for the club in April 2000 against Sheffield Eagles.

Roden returned to Oldham for the 2007 season, signing a two-year contract with the club. He was named as Oldham's captain ahead of the 2011 season.

Roden announced his retirement in October 2013.

International honours
Roden won two caps for Ireland while at Oldham in 2003.

References

External links
Statistics at orl-heritagetrust.org.uk

1980 births
Living people
Rugby league players from Wigan
Rugby league five-eighths
Rugby league halfbacks
Chorley Lynx players
Oldham R.L.F.C. players
Batley Bulldogs players
Leigh Leopards players
Ireland national rugby league team players